Glendale, New Jersey may refer to:
Glendale, Camden County, New Jersey
Glendale, Mercer County, New Jersey